L Street or "L" Street is the twelfth of a sequence of alphabetical streets in many cities (or eleventh, if "I" or "J" is omitted).
 
It may refer to:
L Street (Washington, D.C.)
L Street (Barstow, California)
L Streets, Dallas, a neighborhood in Dallas, Texas

See also
L Street Bridge, bridge over Rock Creek in Washington, D.C.
L Street Brownies, polar bear club in Boston, Massachusetts
Carson Beach, South Boston, also known as L Street Beach